Islando Patrício Sebastião Manuel, a.k.a. Papá Ngulo, (born 7 January 1991), is an Angolan professional basketball player.

Professional career
Since 2009, Manuel plays for Angolan side Primeiro de Agosto in the Angolan Basketball League.

International career
In May 2013, Islando was summoned for the 2013 Afrobasket preliminary Angolan squad.

References

External links
 2009 U-19 FIBA World Cup Stats
 2008 U-18 FIBA Africa Championship Stats
 JornaldeAngola Interview pt
 RealGM Profile

1991 births
Living people
Basketball players from Luanda
Angolan men's basketball players
Power forwards (basketball)
C.D. Primeiro de Agosto men's basketball players
African Games bronze medalists for Angola
African Games medalists in basketball
2014 FIBA Basketball World Cup players
Competitors at the 2011 All-Africa Games